Vera Volkova ((31 May 1905 – 5 May 1975) was a Russian ballet dancer and expatriate dance teacher.

Born near Tomsk, she trained at Petrograd's Akim Volynsky's School of Russian Ballet with Maria Romanova (the mother of Galina Ulanova). She also studied with the renowned Russian ballet mistress Agrippina Vaganova, and is credited with popularising the Vaganova method in the West. She danced professionally with various ensembles such as the GATOB (1925-1929) and the Flying Russian Ballet before defecting in 1929.  She defected in Shanghai as she was hopeful she could join Diaghilev's Ballets Russes. As she heard of his death, she decided to stay there and danced with George Goncharov.

In 1943, she gave up dancing and opens a dance studio in Knightsbridge then the West End. She spent a number of years teaching at the Sadler's Wells Ballet and Sadler's Wells Ballet School, training some of the leading English dancers of the 20th century. She also taught at the Ballet School of the La Scala Theatre in Milan. She became a permanent teacher at the Royal Danish Ballet school in the 1950s, again training some of the school's greatest dancers.

Students
Carla Fracci, former Principal of Italian La Scala theatre
Alicia Alonso, Cuban Prima Ballerina Assoluta and founder of the Cuban National Ballet
Erik Bruhn, former Principal of the Royal Danish Ballet
Henry Danton, former Soloist of the Sadler's Wells Ballet
Dame Margot Fonteyn, English Prima Ballerina Assoluta of The Royal Ballet
Henning Kronstam, former Principal of the Royal Danish Ballet
Dame Gillian Lynne, former Principal of The Royal Ballet, now a renowned musical theatre choreographer
Peter Martins, former Principal of the Royal Danish Ballet and New York City Ballet
Sir Peter Wright, former Principal dancer and Artistic Director of Birmingham Royal Ballet
Eva Evdokimova, international guest dancer, recognised as a Prima Ballerina Assoluta
Sir Kenneth MacMillan', artistic director of the Royal Ballet in London between 1970 and 1977

Bibliography

References

1905 births
1975 deaths
People from Tomsk Oblast
People from Tomsk Governorate
Soviet ballerinas
Ballet teachers
Soviet emigrants to the United Kingdom
Soviet defectors